Matt Vidal is a British-American sociologist. He is Reader in Sociology and Comparative Political Economy in the Institute for International Management, Loughborough University London.

Education 
Vidal graduated from South Dakota State University and received his PhD in Sociology from the University of Wisconsin-Madison. He has been a Postdoctoral Fellow at the University of California, Los Angeles (UCLA) Institute for Research on Labor and Employment, a Research Fellow at the Weizenbaum Institute for the Networked Society, Berlin, and a visiting researcher at the Department of Management, Paris Dauphine University, Paris, and the Max Planck Institute for the Study of Societies, Cologne.

Contributions 
Vidal has made contributions to many areas, including sociology of work, human resource management and employment relations; labor markets; institutional theory; comparative political economy; and Marxist theory.

He is author of Organizing Prosperity (Economic Policy Institute) and co-editor of Comparative Political Economy of Work (Palgrave) and The Oxford Handbook of Karl Marx (Oxford University Press).

References 

Year of birth missing (living people)
Living people
American sociologists
British sociologists
South Dakota State University alumni
University of Wisconsin–Madison College of Letters and Science alumni